In mathematics, the term developable may refer to:

 A developable space in general topology.
 A developable surface in geometry.
 A tangent developable surface of a space curve

Mathematics disambiguation pages